Hukvaldy is a municipality and village in Frýdek-Místek District in the Moravian-Silesian Region of the Czech Republic. It has about 2,100 inhabitants. It is known for the ruins of the third-largest castle in the Czech Republic, Hukvaldy Castle, and is the birthplace of the composer Leoš Janáček.

Administrative parts
Villages of Dolní Sklenov, Horní Sklenov, Krnalovice and Rychaltice are administrative parts of Hukvaldy.

Etymology
The name is derived from the Hückeswagen family, who were the first owners of Hukvaldy.

History

The Hukvaldy Castle was founded in the 1270s or 1280s by the Hückeswagen family and was first mentioned in 1285. It was a guard castle on the trade route from Olomouc to Kraków. The settlement of Hukvaldy was soon established nearby. The settlement of Sklenov was established under the castle and was first documented in 1294.

Between 1294 and 1307, the Hukvaldy estate was acquired by the bishops of Olomouc, who often pledged it to various noblemen. In the following centuries, the castle was expanded into a massive fortress. In 1762, the castle was destroyed by a fire.  In the following decades, the castle was dismantled as a source of building material. Repairs began in the 1960s.

The municipality was known as Sklenov until 1982. Since 1 July 1982, it has been named Hukvaldy.

Culture
Until 2017 Janáček's Hukvaldy music festival took place in Hukvaldy. Since 2018, it has been a part of the Leoš Janáček International Music Festival in Ostrava. It is one of the most important classical music festival in the Czech Republic.

Sights

Hukvaldy Castle is the third largest castle in the country. It is gradually being reconstructed. There is an exhibition on the history and architectural development of the castle. Accessible are also well-preserved guard rooms, or the Baroque Chapel of St. Andrew used for concerts. Part of the palace was converted into a lookout tower.

The castle is surrounded by a game park, founded in the 16th century. It is home to fallow deers, mouflons and wild boars. In the game park is an amphitheatre and the Monument of Bystrouška from Janáček's opera The Cunning Little Vixen.

Notable people
Jan Čapek of Sány (c. 1390 – c. 1452), nobleman and military officer; owned the castle and probably died here
Friedrich Egon von Fürstenberg (1813–1892), archbishop of Olomouc; died here
Leoš Janáček (1854–1928), composer

Gallery

References

External links

Hukvaldy Castle

Villages in Frýdek-Místek District